Aqualate Mere, in Staffordshire, is the largest natural lake in the English Midlands and is managed as a national nature reserve (NNR) by Natural England.

It is within the grounds of Aqualate Hall, a country house, with a landscaped deer park.

Although large in extent (1.5 km long and 0.5 km wide), the Mere is remarkably shallow and is nowhere much more than one metre (3.3 ft) deep. Aqualate Mere is an example of an esker system (rare in the Midlands) formed by glacial meltwaters during the late Devensian glaciation. The depression in which the Mere lies, thought to be a kettle hole, and the surrounding higher ground which comprises glacial sand and gravel deposits were all formed at the same time.

It is fed by streams coming from the north, south and east (including Back Brook), and its outflow to the west forms the River Meese which joins the River Tern, a tributary of the River Severn.

The Mere supports diverse fish and bird populations, including large numbers of wintering and breeding wildfowl and breeding Eurasian curlew and common snipe. Together with the surrounding land, it is also important for its botanical and invertebrate communities. Mammals found on the NNR include polecat, water vole and harvest mouse, together with bats such as pipistrelle, Daubenton's, Natterer's, Brandt's and whiskered.

Its name came from Anglo-Saxon Āc-gelād, meaning "oak grove", influenced by Latin "aqua" = water, "lata" = wide.

Wildlife
The NNR is notified in part for its plants and vegetation, particularly its extensive wet meadows which are derived from ancient peat bogs. Species of interest include purple small-reed, meadow thistle, tubular water-dropwort and marsh St. John's-wort. It contains a sizeable heronry and many species of birds, and is considered notable for beetles, flies and moths.

References 

Lakes of Staffordshire
Kettle lakes in the United Kingdom